The 238 lizard species found in Colombia represent 13 families.

Corytophanidae

Hoplocercidae

Iguanidae

Dactyloidae

Tropiduridae

Iguania Images

Gekkonidae

Sphaerodactylidae

Phyllodactylidae

Gekkota Images

Amphisbaenidae

Amphisbaenia Images

Anguidae

Gymnophthalmidae

Scincidae

Teiidae

Autarchoglossa Images

See also
Fauna of Colombia
Reptiles of Colombia
Snakes of Colombia

References

External links 
 
 

Lizards
C